Mirko Milašević (born 27 July 1985) is a Montenegrin handball player for Serbian club Jugović.

Club career
After starting out at Jugović, Milašević played for fellow Serbian clubs Vojvodina and Crvena zvezda, before returning to his native Montenegro. He later moved abroad and played for Toledo, Alcobendas, HSC Suhr Aarau, Puerto Sagunto, Billère, Dinamo București, Veszprém and Göztepe.

International career
At youth level, Milašević represented Serbia and Montenegro at the 2005 World Under-21 Championship, as the team finished as runners-up.

A Montenegro international since its inception, Milašević participated at the 2008 European Championship in the nation's debut appearance in major tournaments. He also took part at the 2013 World Championship.

Honours
Vojvodina
 Serbia and Montenegro Handball Super League: 2004–05
 Serbia and Montenegro Handball Cup: 2004–05, 2005–06
 Serbian Handball Super League: 2015–16, 2018–19
 Serbian Handball Cup: 2018–19
 Serbian Handball Super Cup: 2018, 2019
Crvena zvezda
 Serbian Handball Super League: 2006–07, 2007–08

References

External links
 EHF record
 SEHA record
 MKSZ record

1985 births
Living people
Sportspeople from Cetinje
Montenegrin male handball players
RK Jugović players
RK Vojvodina players
RK Crvena zvezda players
Veszprém KC players
Expatriate handball players
Montenegrin expatriate sportspeople in Serbia
Montenegrin expatriate sportspeople in Spain
Montenegrin expatriate sportspeople in Switzerland
Montenegrin expatriate sportspeople in France
Montenegrin expatriate sportspeople in Romania
Montenegrin expatriate sportspeople in Hungary
Montenegrin expatriate sportspeople in Turkey